Misaki Doi and Nao Hibino were the defending champions, but chose not to participate.

Jiang Xinyu and Tang Qianhui won the title, defeating Ankita Raina and Rosalie van der Hoek in the final, 3–6, 6–3, [10–5].

Seeds

Draw

Draw

References
Main Draw

Suzhou Ladies Open - Doubles